Luigi Amerio (15 August 1912 – 28 September 2004), was an Italian electrical engineer and mathematician. He is known for his work on almost periodic functions, on Laplace transforms in one and several dimensions, and on the theory of elliptic partial differential equations.

Works
A selection of Luigi Amerio's scientific papers is published in the two volumes of his "Selecta" : he is also the author of several university textbooks and, jointly with his pupil Giovanni Prouse, he wrote the influential monograph on almost periodic functions .

. In this work, Luigi Amerio proves an important theorem on Laplace transform.
.
. In this paper Amerio obtained the first theoretical results on Mauro Picone's method of solving boundary value problems for elliptic partial differential equations by the Riesz-Fischer theorem.
.
.
. Luigi Amerio's "Selecta" in two volumes, collecting a selection of his scientific contributions.

Addresses, biographical and survey papers

. An ample survey on the research results in mathematical analysis, including the theory of integral equations and the theory of ordinary and partial differential equations, obtained by Italian mathematicians during the Second world war, published by the Pontificial Academy of Sciences.
.
. A survey paper on the contribution of Mauro Picone and his school to applied mathematics through the foundation and the direction of the "Istituto per le Applicazioni del Calcolo".
. The "Address" of Amerio at the meeting "Ricordo di Gaetano Fichera" held in Rome at the Accademia Nazionale dei Lincei on 8 February 1997.

See also
Gaetano Fichera
Analytic continuation
Boundary value problem

References

Biographical and general references
. A volume of the journal dedicated to Luigi Amerio.
. The transcription of an ample interview with Luigi Amerio by Claudio Citrini, one of Amerio's pupils and collaborators.
. "Luigi Amerio, master in science and life" is the commemorative speech pronounced by Claudio Citrini, on the occasion of a meeting dedicated to his memory.
. A biographical paper written by Giovanni Prouse, pupil and collaborator of Amerio.
. The biographical and bibliographical entry (updated up to 1976) on Luigi Amerio, published under the auspices of the Accademia dei Lincei in a book collecting many profiles of its living members up to 1976.

Scientific references
. An ample survey paper on results on the solutions of linear integral and partial differential equation obtained by the research team of Mauro Picone at the Istituto Nazionale per le Applicazioni del Calcolo using the methods of functional analysis.
. A survey on research results in complex analysis, including the theory of functions of several complex variables and the theory of analytic functionals, obtained by Italian mathematicians during the Second world war, published by the Pontificial Academy of Sciences.
.
.

Publications dedicated to him or to his memory

. A volume of the journal dedicated to the memory of Luigi Amerio, by several friends, colleagues and pupils.

1912 births
2004 deaths
20th-century Italian mathematicians
21st-century Italian mathematicians
Italian electrical engineers
Members of the Lincean Academy
Complex analysts
Mathematical analysts
PDE theorists
Scientists from Padua
Engineers from Padua